FS Me is a typeface/font that has been described as the first to have been designed in consultation with a group of people with learning disabilities and designed for use by this population. It was developed by Jason Smith in response to a commission from the charity Mencap in 2008. It was the only font featured in the D&AD Annual 2009 covering advertising and design work.

References

Corporate typefaces
Sans-serif typefaces
Assistive technology
Humanist sans-serif typefaces